CD5 antigen-like is a protein that in humans is encoded by the CD5L gene.

References

External links

Further reading